Qaleh Chay District is in Ajab Shir County, East Azerbaijan province, Iran. At the 2006 census, its population was 18,724 in 4,204 households. The following census in 2011 counted 16,779 people in 4,561 households. At the latest census in 2016, the district had 17,007 inhabitants living in 5,058 households.

References 

Ajab Shir County

Districts of East Azerbaijan Province

Populated places in East Azerbaijan Province

Populated places in Ajab Shir County